Stéphane Vehrle-Smith (born 15 May 1989) is a Brazilian field hockey player. He competed in the men's field hockey tournament at the 2016 Summer Olympics, 2017 Pan American Cup, 2015 Pan American Games, 2014 South American Games, 2014 World Hockey League, 2013 Pan American Cup and 2013 South American Championship.

Results

References

1989 births
Living people
Brazilian male field hockey players
Olympic field hockey players of Brazil
Field hockey players at the 2016 Summer Olympics
Place of birth missing (living people)
Field hockey players at the 2015 Pan American Games
Holcombe Hockey Club players
Hampstead & Westminster Hockey Club players
Pan American Games competitors for Brazil
Sportspeople from Recife
21st-century Brazilian people